In Greek mythology, Melantheia or Melanthea (Ancient Greek: Μελανθείας) was the daughter of the river-god Alpheus, and thus she can be counted as a naiad. Melanthea bore to Poseidon, Eirene whom the earlier name of Calaurea was called after her (Eirenê). Later on, this island was named Anthedonia and Hypereia by the companions of the siblings Anthus and Hypera.

Note

Reference 

 Plutarch, Moralia with an English Translation by Frank Cole Babbitt. Cambridge, MA. Harvard University Press. London. William Heinemann Ltd. 1936. Online version at the Perseus Digital Library. Greek text available from the same website.

Naiads